The Interior Board of Land Appeals (IBLA) is an appellate review body that exercises the delegated authority of the United States secretary of the interior to issue final decisions for the United States Department of the Interior.

Structure and functions 
Its administrative judges decide appeals from bureau decisions relating to the use and disposition of public lands and their resources, mineral resources on the Outer Continental Shelf, and the conduct of surface coal mining operations under the Surface Mining Control and Reclamation Act of 1977. Located within the Department's Office of Hearings and Appeals, IBLA is separate and independent from the bureaus and offices whose decisions it reviews.

IBLA is headed by a chief administrative judge. IBLA's decisions are final for the department and may be reviewed by the United States district courts.

Overview 
IBLA has the authority to consider the following types of cases:
Appeals from a variety of decisions of the Bureau of Land Management, including but not limited to decisions regarding mining, grazing, energy development, royalty management, timber harvesting, wildfire management, recreation, wild horse and burro management, cadastral surveys, Alaska land conveyances, rights of way, land exchanges, and trespass actions;
Appeals from decisions of the Office of Natural Resources Revenue and the deputy assistant secretary for natural resources revenue regarding royalty management;
Appeals from decisions of the Bureau of Ocean Energy Management and the Bureau of Safety and Environmental Enforcement;
Appeals from decisions of the Bureau of Indian Affairs regarding minerals management on Indian lands;
Appeals from decisions of the Office of Surface Mining Reclamation and Enforcement regarding surface coal mining operations; and
Appeals from decisions of administrative law judges in OHA's Departmental Cases Hearings Division.

References

United States Department of the Interior agencies